Kenny is a designated suburb in the Canberra, Australia district of Gungahlin. The suburb is named in honour of Elizabeth Kenny, an Australian who pioneered muscle rehabilitation practices which serve as the foundation of physiotherapy. It is adjacent to the suburbs of Watson, Lyneham, the Mitchell industrial estate, Harrison and Throsby and bounded by the Federal Highway to the east and Horse Park Drive to the north. The suburb Kenny is situated about 4 km from the Gungahlin Towncentre and 8 km from the centre of Canberra.

History
Portions of Kenny are currently occupied by the rural properties Bendoura, and Canberra Park. 'Canberra Park' was established by William Ginn,  who previously worked for George Campbell, of Duntroon, and lived at Blundell's Cottage from 1859 The cottage  named after a later resident George Blundell was located near to what was until the 1960s the Molonglo River and since then by Lake Burley Griffin. Ploughman William Ginn and his family were the first to live in the farmhouse, departing ten years later when they moved to 'Canberra Park'.

Geology

Located in the suburb is part of Sullivans Creek, which flows on into Mitchell. The high side is on the east, with creeks flowing in the south west direction. The suburb is fairly flat. The geology of the area is mudstone and shale from the Canberra Formation of middle Silurian age. Around the creeks is plenty of alluvium.

See also
 Elizabeth Kenny
 Geology of the Australian Capital Territory

References

Suburbs of Canberra